Albert Webster (25 May 1925 – 20 June 2010) was a British middle-distance runner. He competed in the men's 800 metres at the 1952 Summer Olympics. He grew up in Sutton-in-Ashfield.

References

External links
 

1925 births
2010 deaths
Athletes (track and field) at the 1952 Summer Olympics
British male middle-distance runners
Olympic athletes of Great Britain
Sportspeople from Sutton-in-Ashfield
Place of birth missing